Ettore Fieramosca may refer to: 

 Ettore Fieramosca (1476–1515), an Italian nobleman and mercenary captain
 Ettore Fieramosca (novel), an 1833 work by Massimo d'Azeglio
 Ettore Fieramosca (1909 film), a short silent Italian film directed by Ernesto Maria Pasquali 
 Ettore Fieramosca (1915 film) a silent Italian film directed by Domenico Gaido and Umberto Paradisi 
 Ettore Fieramosca (1938 film), an Italian film directed by Alessandro Blasetti 
 Italian cruiser Ettore Fieramosca, an Italian cruiser launched in 1888
 Italian submarine Ettore Fieramosca, an Italian submarine launched in 1929